The Sixth Extinction or Holocene extinction is the ongoing extinction event of species during the present Holocene epoch.

Sixth Extinction may also refer to:
 The Sixth Extinction: An Unnatural History, a 2014 book by Elizabeth Kolbert about the Holocene extinction
 The Sixth Extinction, a 1996 book by Richard Leakey and Roger Lewin
 "The Sixth Extinction" (The X-Files), an episode of The X-Files
 "The Sixth Extinction II: Amor Fati", an episode of The X-Files
 "The Sixth Extinction", an Ayreon song from the album 01011001
 "The Sixth Extinction Crept Up Slowly, Like Sunlight Through the Shutters, as We Looked Back in Regret", a Red Sparowes song from the album At the Soundless Dawn

See also
List of extinction events